Anatoli Borisovich Shelest (born 6 January 1955) is a Ukrainian and Russian professional football coach and a former player.

His son Taras Shelest is a professional footballer.

External links 
 

1955 births
Living people
Soviet footballers
Russian footballers
FC Zirka Kropyvnytskyi players
FC Dnipro players
FC Lokomotiv Moscow players
SC Tavriya Simferopol players
Östers IF players
IFK Luleå players
Russian football managers
Soviet expatriate footballers
Russian expatriate footballers
Russian expatriate football managers
Expatriate footballers in Sweden
Expatriate footballers in Germany
Russian expatriate sportspeople in Latvia
Expatriate football managers in Lithuania
Russian expatriate sportspeople in Lithuania
FK Liepājas Metalurgs managers
FC Oryol managers
FK Atlantas managers
Association football midfielders
1. FC Neubrandenburg 04 players